The Aircrew Survival Egress Knife or ASEK is a U.S. Army aircrew survival knife, designed and initially manufactured by the Ontario Knife Company, and entered service in 2003.

Development and Adoption
 
The ASEK replaced the "knife, hunting, survival pilots", which had a number of problems with the leather sheath and handle, the sharpening stone, and corrosion resistance. (The 1958 designed knife is still issued by US military, and is currently made by Ontario Knife. It has not been fully replaced as of 2014.) Requirements for the replacement knife, set by the United States Army Aviation Branch, included tests in:
sawing through aircraft skin and acrylic glass windows
cutting
hammering
Required features included:
a point used to stab
a hand guard
durability
light weight
holes for tying the knife to a stick to act as a spear

Other features, such as an electrically insulated handle, were deemed desirable, but not required.  Packaged in the sheath are a special tool for cutting seat belts and a diamond impregnated sharpening disk.  The ASEK, made by Ontario, was adopted after trials by United States Army Natick Soldier Research, Development and Engineering Center in Natick, Massachusetts.

The US Army's Defense Supply Center purchased 11,881 Army ASEKs in 2004 and 2005 for equipping Aviation Life Support Equipment (ALSE) vests.

Features

It has a number of features that aid in escaping an aircraft, such as the ability to be used as a hammer to break acrylic glass cockpit windows and cut through an aircraft's aluminium skin. It may also be used as a screwdriver or precision edge marker. It includes a crushed diamond disk sharpener and a separate blade for cutting through seatbelt webbing.

During the initial evaluation, an electrically insulated handle was considered to be desirable but not mandatory.  The United States Army Aeromedical Research Lab (USAARL) considered the lack of insulated handle of the Ontario knife to be a catastrophic failure of the standard, and Ontario is redesigning their ASEK to meet this requirement.

Gerber LMF II ASEK

In May 2005, Gerber Legendary Blades introduced its own ASEK-compliant knife (available commercially under the name LMF II) to the military for evaluation.  The Gerber ASEK met all requirements, and outperformed the Ontario model in the area of electrical insulation.  The Gerber ASEK has been approved for purchase, and Gerber released an additional version with a foliage green handle to match the Army Combat Uniform.  The knife also comes with a parachute cutter that has a separate sheath which can be attached to a MOLLE vest.

References

See also
List of individual weapons of the U.S. Armed Forces
M9 bayonet
AB-0200

Military knives
Military equipment of the United States
United States Army aviation
Military equipment introduced in the 2000s